Tryon is an English surname. Notable people with the surname include:

Charles Tryon, 2nd Baron Tryon (1906–1976), British peer
Chloe Tryon (born 1994), South African cricketer
Darrell Tryon (1942-2013), Australian linguist
Dwight William Tryon (1849–1925), American painter
Edward Tryon (fl. 20th century), American physicist
George Tryon (1832–1893), British naval officer
George Tryon, 1st Baron Tryon (1871–1940), British peer
George Washington Tryon (1838–1888), Jr., American malacologist
James R. Tryon (1837–1912), American naval doctor and Surgeon General of the United States Navy
Joe Tryon-Shoyinka (born 1999), American football player
Justin Tryon (born 1984), American football player
Kate Tryon (1865–1952), American journalist, artist and lecturer
Richard Tryon (1837 —1905), British Army officer and cricketer
Richard T. Tryon, retired U.S. Marine lieutenant general.
Robert Tryon (1901-1967), American behavioral psychologist/geneticist
Rolla M. Tryon Jr. (1916–2001), American botanist
Thomas Tryon (1634–1703), British vegetarian
Thomas Tryon (architect) (1859–1920), American architect
Tom Tryon (1926–1991), American actor and author
Ty Tryon (born 1984), American professional golfer
Valerie Tryon (born 1934), Canadian pianist
William Tryon (1729–1788), British colonial governor in America